The Toyota TF102 was the car with which the Toyota team competed in the 2002 Formula One season, the team's inaugural Championship campaign. The car reflected the results of a year's testing in 2001 with the TF101, and was designed primarily by Dago Rohrer, Gustav Brunner and René Hilhorst. The engine was designed by Luca Marmorini. As with the TF101, it was piloted during the season by Mika Salo and Allan McNish.

Development

The car had a much more conventional look in the aerodynamic sense than the test car did, something that was commented on by Brunner at its launch in November 2001: "The car tested during 2001 showed the results we wanted. This new model reflects the latest technology, and has a much more conventional setup than the test car."

The car sported a different paint livery than the one seen on the test car, with a more abstract red and white design taking over from the contoured lines of the previous model.

Performance

At the opening race of the 2002 season in Melbourne, Salo came home sixth to give the team a point on its Formula One début. The Finn added a second point two races later, in Brazil.

McNish, meanwhile, was on course for a point of his own in Malaysia, but a pit-lane mistake by the team meant he finished seventh. During qualifying for the final race of the season, at Suzuka, he wrote off a chassis completely when he crashed at the super-quick 130R corner, also tearing a hole in the Armco barrier. However, he sustained no serious injury, which paid testament to the safety of the TF102.

The two points put Toyota tenth in the Constructors' Championship, behind Minardi on count-back (Mark Webber had finished fifth in Australia) but ahead of the financially troubled Arrows.

Team principal Ove Andersson had warned at the beginning of the season that it would be very much a "learning year" and overall the car's performance was received with optimism due to its sturdy reliability.

Complete Formula One results
(key) (results in bold indicate pole position)

References

External links
TF102 Evolution at Toyota F1 official site
TF102 Facts at f1db.com

Toyota Formula One cars
2002 Formula One season cars